Alfonso Portugal Díaz (21 January 1934 – 12 June 2016) was a Mexican football player, who played as defender for Mexico in the 1958 FIFA World Cup.

Career
Portugal captained Club América to the 1965–66 Mexican Primera División title. He also played for Club Necaxa. In 1967, he appeared in one match for the Chicago Spurs of the NPSL

References

External links
FIFA profile

Profile at MedioTiempo

1934 births
2016 deaths
Mexico international footballers
Association football defenders
Liga MX players
Club Necaxa footballers
Club América footballers
Club Universidad Nacional footballers
1958 FIFA World Cup players
National Professional Soccer League (1967) players
Chicago Spurs players
Mexican football managers
Cruz Azul managers
Atlas F.C. managers
Tigres UANL managers
Footballers from Mexico City
Mexican footballers
Mexican expatriate footballers
Expatriate soccer players in the United States
Mexican expatriate sportspeople in the United States